Wesley Trent Snipes (born July 31, 1962) is an American actor, film producer, and martial artist. His prominent film roles include Major League (1989), New Jack City (1991), Jungle Fever (1991), White Men Can't Jump (1992), Passenger 57 (1992), Rising Sun (1993), Demolition Man (1993), To Wong Foo, Thanks for Everything! Julie Newmar (1995), U.S. Marshals (1998), The Expendables 3 (2014), Coming 2 America (2021), and the Blade film trilogy (1998–2004), portraying Blade. In television, he is known for his role on The Player (2015). Snipes was nominated for the Independent Spirit Award for Best Supporting Male for his work in The Waterdance (1992) and won the Volpi Cup for Best Actor for his performance in the film One Night Stand (1997).

He formed a production company, Amen-Ra Films, in 1991, and a subsidiary, Black Dot Media, to develop projects for film and television. He has been training in martial arts since the age of 12, earning a 5th dan black belt in Shotokan Karate and 2nd dan black belt in Hapkido.

Early life
Snipes was born in Orlando, Florida, the son of Marian (née Long), a teacher's assistant, and Wesley Rudolph Snipes, an aircraft engineer. He grew up in the Bronx, New York. He attended the High School of Performing Arts of Fiorello H. LaGuardia High School of Music & Art and Performing Arts but moved back to Florida before he could graduate. After graduating from Jones High School in Orlando, Snipes returned to New York and attended the State University of New York at Purchase. He also attended Southwestern College in California.

Career

Acting

At the age of 23, Snipes was discovered by an agent while performing in a competition. He made his film debut in the 1986 Goldie Hawn vehicle Wildcats. Later that year, he appeared on the TV show Miami Vice as a drug-dealing pimp in the episode "Streetwise" (first aired December 5, 1986). In 1987, he appeared as Michael Jackson's nemesis in the Martin Scorsese–directed music video "Bad" and the feature film Streets of Gold. That same year, Snipes was also considered for the role of Geordi La Forge in the TV series Star Trek: The Next Generation, but the role eventually went to LeVar Burton. Snipes auditioned & lobbied hard for the role of Leroy Green in the 1985 cult classic movie The Last Dragon but the role was given to Taimak instead.

Snipes's performance in the music video "Bad" caught the eye of director Spike Lee. Snipes turned down a small role in Lee's Do the Right Thing for the larger part of Willie Mays Hayes in Major League, beginning a succession of box-office hits for Snipes. Lee would later cast Snipes as the jazz saxophonist Shadow Henderson in Mo' Better Blues and as the lead in the interracial romance drama Jungle Fever. After the success of Jungle Fever, The Washington Post described Snipes as "the most celebrated new actor of the season". He then played Thomas Flanagan in King of New York opposite Christopher Walken. He played the drug lord Nino Brown in New Jack City, which was written specifically for him by Barry Michael Cooper. He also played a drug dealer in the 1994 film Sugar Hill.

Snipes has played a number of roles in action films like Passenger 57, Demolition Man (with Sylvester Stallone), Money Train, The Fan, U.S. Marshals and Rising Sun, as well as comedies like White Men Can't Jump, and To Wong Foo, Thanks for Everything! Julie Newmar where he played a drag queen. Snipes has appeared in dramas like The Waterdance and Disappearing Acts.

In 1997, he won the Best Actor Volpi Cup at the 54th Venice Film Festival for his performance in New Line Cinema's One Night Stand. In 1998, Snipes had his largest commercial success with Blade as the title character, which has grossed over $150 million worldwide. The film spawned a franchise. He also received a star on the Hollywood Walk of Fame and an honorary doctorate in humanities and fine arts from his alma mater, SUNY/Purchase. In 2004, Snipes reprised his role in the third film, Blade: Trinity, which he also produced. In 2005, he sued New Line Cinema and David S. Goyer, the film's studio and director, respectively. He claimed that the studio did not pay his full salary, that he was intentionally cut out of casting decisions, and that his character's screen time was reduced in favor of co-stars Ryan Reynolds and Jessica Biel. The suit was later settled, but no details were released. Snipes later discussed reprising the role of Blade in the Marvel Cinematic Universe, but was replaced by Mahershala Ali. Trinity was his last theatrical release in the U.S. until 2010.

He later appeared in The Contractor, filmed in Bulgaria and the UK, Gallowwalkers, released in 2012, and Game of Death. Snipes was originally slated to play one of the four leads in Spike Lee's 2008 war film Miracle at St. Anna but had to leave the film due to tax problems; his role eventually went to Derek Luke.

Snipes made a comeback performance in Brooklyn's Finest as Casanova "Caz" Phillips, a supporting character, it was his first theatrical release film since 2004. He also had to turn down the part of Hale Caesar in The Expendables because he was not allowed to leave the United States without the court's approval. In 2014, he appeared in the sequel The Expendables 3. His comedic role-playing D'Urville Martin in Dolemite Is My Name has earned him positive reviews and a number of award nominations.

Other ventures
In the late 1990s, Snipes and his brother started a security firm called the Royal Guard of Amen-Ra, dedicated to providing VIPs with bodyguards trained in law enforcement and martial arts. Amen-Ra is also the name of his film company. In 1996, the first film produced by Amen-Ra was A Great And Mighty Walk – Dr. John Henrik Clarke.

In 2000, the business was investigated for alleged ties to the United Nuwaubian Nation of Moors. It emerged that Snipes had spotted  of land near their Tama-Re compound in Putnam County, Georgia, intending to buy and use it for his business academy. Both Snipes's business and the groups used Egyptian motifs as their symbols. Ultimately, Snipes and his brother did not buy the land, instead establishing their company in Florida, Antigua, and Africa.

In 2005, Snipes entered into negotiations to fight Fear Factor host Joe Rogan on Ultimate Fighting Match, but the deal fell through.

Personal life

Snipes began training in martial arts when he was 12 years old. He has a 5th degree black belt in Shotokan karate and a 2nd degree black belt in Hapkido. He has also trained in Capoeira under Mestre Jelon Vieira and in a number of other disciplines including kung fu at the USA Shaolin Temple and Brazilian Jiu Jitsu and Kickboxing. During his time in New York, Snipes was trained in fighting by his friend and mentor Brooke Ellis.

Snipes has been married twice, first to April Snipes (née Dubois), with whom he has a son Jelani, who had a cameo role in Snipes' 1990 film Mo' Better Blues. In 2003, Snipes married painter Nakyung "Nikki" Park, with whom he has four children.
 
Snipes, who was raised a Christian, converted to Islam in 1978, but left Islam in 1988. During a 1991 interview, Snipes said "Islam made me more conscious of what African people have accomplished, of my self-worth, and gave me some self-dignity".

Snipes' apartment in New York City was destroyed by the collapse of the World Trade Center's Twin Towers during the September 11 attacks. He was on the West Coast at the time.

Income tax conviction
On October 12, 2006, Snipes, Eddie Ray Kahn, and Douglas P. Rosile were charged with one count of conspiring to defraud the United States and one count of knowingly making or aiding and abetting the making of a false and fraudulent claim for payment against the United States. Snipes was also charged with six counts of willfully failing to file federal income tax returns by their filing dates. The conspiracy charge against Snipes alleged that he filed a false amended return, including a false tax refund claim of over $4 million for the year 1996, and a false amended return, including a false tax refund claim of over US$7.3 million for the year 1997. The government alleged that Snipes attempted to obtain fraudulent tax refunds using a tax protester theory called the "861 argument" (essentially, an argument that the domestic income of U.S. citizens and residents is not taxable). The government also charged that Snipes sent three worthless, fictitious "bills of exchange" for $14 million to the Internal Revenue Service (IRS).

The government also charged that Snipes failed to file tax returns for the years 1999 through 2004. Snipes responded to his indictment in a letter on December 4, 2006, declaring himself to be "a non-resident alien" of the United States; in reality, Snipes is a birthright U.S. citizen. Such tactics are common of the "Freemen", "Sovereign Citizen", or "OPCA" (Organized Pseudolegal Commercial Argument) category of litigation strategy.

Snipes retained Robert Barnes as his defense attorney. On February 1, 2008, Snipes was acquitted on the felony count of conspiracy to defraud the government and on the felony count of filing a false claim with the government. He was found guilty on three misdemeanor counts of failing to file federal income tax returns (and acquitted on three other "failure to file" charges). His co-defendants, Douglas P. Rosile and Eddie Ray Kahn, were convicted on the conspiracy and false claim charges in connection with the income tax refund claims filed for Snipes.

On April 24, 2008, Snipes was sentenced to three years in prison for willful failure to file federal income tax returns under . Kahn was sentenced to ten years in prison and Rosile was sentenced to four and a half years in prison. The United States Court of Appeals for the Eleventh Circuit affirmed Snipes's convictions in a 35-page decision issued on July 16, 2010. Snipes reported to federal prison on December 9, 2010 to begin his three-year sentence, and was held at McKean Federal Correctional Institution, a federal prison in Pennsylvania. On June 6, 2011, the United States Supreme Court declined to hear Snipes's appeal. Snipes was released from federal prison on April 2, 2013, finishing his period of house arrest on July 19, 2013.

On November 1, 2018, the United States Tax Court ruled that the Internal Revenue Service did not abuse its discretion in rejecting an offer in compromise made by Snipes and in sustaining the filing of a notice of federal tax lien in connection with approximately $23.5 million in Federal tax liabilities for tax year 2001 and years 2003 through 2006.

Filmography

Publications
 Talon of God (co-written with Ray Norman) (July 25, 2017)

Awards and nominations

References

External links

 
 

1962 births
20th-century American male actors
21st-century American male actors
Action choreographers
Activists from New York City
African-American former Christians
African-American male actors
African-American writers
American capoeira practitioners
American film producers
American former Muslims
American hapkido practitioners
American male karateka
American male film actors
American male taekwondo practitioners
American male television actors
American people convicted of tax crimes
American practitioners of Brazilian jiu-jitsu
American prisoners and detainees
American wushu practitioners
Converts to Islam from Christianity
Entertainers from the Bronx
Fiorello H. LaGuardia High School alumni
Living people
Jones High School (Orlando, Florida) alumni
Male actors from New York City
Male actors from Orlando, Florida
People acquitted of fraud
People from Alpine, New Jersey
Prisoners and detainees of the United States federal government
Shotokan practitioners
State University of New York at Purchase alumni
Tax protesters in the United States
Volpi Cup for Best Actor winners
20th-century African-American people
21st-century African-American people